Alissa Keny-Guyer (born on May 20, 1959) was an American politician and a Democratic member of the Oregon House of Representatives representing District 46 (parts of SE and NE Portland) since her September 27, 2011 appointment by the Multnomah County Board of Commissioners to fill the vacancy caused by the resignation of Ben Cannon.

Over nearly a decade in the Oregon House, Keny-Guyer chaired the House Committee on Human Services & Housing and served on the House Committees on Health Care (vice chair), Revenue, Early Childhood & Family Supports, Consumer Protection & Government Efficiency (interim chair), Energy/Environment/Water, and the Joint Ways & Means Subcommittee on Human Services.

She also served on the Governor's Children's Cabinet, on the Oregon Children’s Integrated Data (OCID) program oversight, and as Assistant Majority Leader for the Oregon House Democrats.

Education
Keny-Guyer earned her BA in human biology from Stanford University and her MPH from the University of Hawaii at Manoa.

Elections
Alissa won her 2012, 2014, 2016, and 2018 Democratic primary and general elections unopposed. In Oregon's fusion voting system that allows nominations from up to three parties, Alissa was nominated by the Democratic, Working Families, and Independent parties in 2014, 2016 and 2018, and the Democratic, Working Families, and Republican parties in 2012.

References

External links
Official page at the Oregon Legislative Assembly
Campaign site
 

Politicians from New York City
1959 births
Living people
Democratic Party members of the Oregon House of Representatives
Politicians from Portland, Oregon
Hotchkiss School alumni
Stanford University alumni
University of Hawaiʻi at Mānoa alumni
Women state legislators in Oregon
21st-century American politicians
21st-century American women politicians